8 Out of 10 Cats is a British comedy panel show broadcast on Channel 4 and its sister networks, airing since 3 June 2005. The show is hosted by Jimmy Carr; the current team captains are Rob Beckett and Katherine Ryan.

The show is based on statistics and opinion polls and draws on polls produced by a variety of organisations and new polls commissioned for the programme, carried out by Harris Poll. The title is derived from an old popular misquoting of a well-known advertising tagline for Whiskas cat food, which claimed that "8 out of 10 owners (later adverts adding "who expressed a preference") said their cats prefer it".

New and past episodes air across the Channel 4 network of channels, with past episodes also repeated on Dave and Comedy Central.

Overview
The show is hosted by comedian Jimmy Carr and features two teams consisting of a regular team captain and two celebrity guests each. Sean Lock appeared as a team captain from series 1 to 18. He was replaced by Rob Beckett at the beginning of series 19. The opposing captain was originally Dave Spikey, who left after series 4 and was replaced by Jason Manford. Manford departed following series 10 and was replaced by Jon Richardson for series 11 to 18. From series 19 to 20, the opposing captain was Aisling Bea. In series 21, the opposing team had a rotating guest captain. However, Katherine Ryan joined as the opposing team captain in series 22.

The original format was filmed the day before broadcast with a live studio audience at BBC Television Centre. The captains are joined by two celebrities and occasionally a guest captain would substitute. Often, topical celebrities appear on the show, for example Ruth Badger following her appearance on The Apprentice.

The format was changed for the move from Channel 4 onto More 4 and E4. Shows are now recorded back to back and no longer cover topical issues. The two team captains were replaced, but Carr still hosts. Filming is currently at Pinewood Studios with a live studio audience.

A full series was not broadcast in 2015, although two Christmas Specials were filmed and aired on 24 and 30 December 2015. No episodes were broadcast during 2018. The 22nd season started on 7 January 2020.

Current rounds
The current rounds featured on 8 Out of 10 Cats are:
 "What Are You Talking About?" – The polling organisation asked the public what they were talking about during the week. The teams have to try to guess the top three.
 "Pick of the Polls" – The teams are given four pictures to pick from and are given a poll based on that picture.
 "Believe It or Not" – The teams are given a statistic and try to guess whether it is true or false.
 "And the Winner Is..." – The teams are given a question from a poll and then try to guess what came on top of that poll.
 "The Poll with a Hole" – each team is given a statistic, but it is missing one piece of salient information. The teams have to guess what that piece of information is.

Until series 8, there were four rounds during the game. It has since been reduced to three.
The points often do not add up correctly, as the show has to be edited to fit its 26-minute slot.
From series 9, there is a longer version of the show called 8 Out of 10 Cats Uncut, broadcast a few days later.

Former rounds
These rounds only featured in series 1 and the Big Brother special shows:
"Face Off" – The teams have to guess who from a list of famous people came top with respect to a particular topic.
"Word Association" – The teams view a clip illustrating a word and have to guess the top three things which people thought of when they heard that word.
"What's the Poll?" – The teams are given five famous people, picture by picture, and they have to guess which poll they appeared on.

8 Out of 10 Cats Does Countdown

Since 2012, crossover episodes between 8 Out of 10 Cats and Countdown have aired. The show follows the format of Countdown, but is hosted by Jimmy Carr. Jon Richardson is the only permanent contestant following Sean Lock's death in 2021.

Other specials
On 4 January 2013, a special episode of Deal or No Deal featuring Carr as host along with Richardson and Lock aired during another Channel 4 "mash-up night", the story behind it being that Noel Edmonds had been driven to leave when Derren Brown was playing and was getting all the boxes from lowest to highest, ensuring that the "dream finish" is in play. Edmonds ran away with Brown's £250,000 box, saying that he "spent it all on his shirt". The backstage personnel took out a hammer and smashed the Break glass for Jimmy Carr'''s box, which produced a horn, which was used to call Carr to the set.

Joe Wilkinson guest starred as the Banker's assistant. The guests were Nicola Adams, Rob Beckett, Gemma Collins, Mia Cross, Corinne Davies, Susie Dent, Matt Forde, John Fothergill, Stephen Frost, Nick Helm, Elis James, Dave Johns, Tony Law, Alice Levine, Mark Olver, Rachel Riley, John Robins, Katherine Ryan, Nong Skett, Andy Smart and Holly Walsh.

Podcasts
A series of podcasts have also been released on iTunes, with material directly from the show, for several episodes. Each podcast is typically the "What Are You Talking About" round from that episode.

Cast

Episodes

DVD8 Out of 10 Cats: Claws Out'' is a ninety-minute collection of highlights from the first few series featuring deleted scenes considered too offensive to be aired. It was released on 20 November 2006.

References

External links

8 Out of 10 Cats at EpisodeWorld.com

2005 British television series debuts
2000s British comedy television series
2010s British comedy television series
2020s British comedy television series
2000s British game shows
2010s British game shows
2020s British game shows
British panel games
Channel 4 comedy
Channel 4 panel games
English-language television shows
Television series by Zeppotron
Television series by Banijay
Television shows shot at BBC Elstree Centre
Television shows shot at Elstree Film Studios
Television shows shot at Teddington Studios